Abdallah I was the Sultan of and on Anjouan island (in the Comoros Islands) two times: 1782-1788 and 1792–1796.

In 1788, he abdicated in favor of his granddaughter Halima.

He ruled a second time from 1792 to 1796.

References

18th-century births
Year of birth missing
Sultans of Anjouan
18th-century monarchs in Africa